Ramenskoye is a town and the administrative center of Ramensky District in Moscow Oblast, Russia, located  southeast of Moscow.

Population
Population:     69,000 (1974); 28,000 (1939).

Etymology
The town's name derives from an Old Slavonic word "" (ramenye), meaning "on the edge of forest".

History

The area where the town now stands was first mentioned in 1328. A stone church was built here by Count Platon Musin-Pushkin in 1725–1730. In the 1770s, the selo of Novo-Troitskoye was established here; its name later changed to Ramenskoye. In 1831, a textile factory was founded in Ramenskoye and by the second half of the 19th century, it had grown to be one of the largest enterprises in the Russian Empire. On March 15, 1926, Ramenskoye was granted town status.

Administrative and municipal status
Within the framework of administrative divisions, Ramenskoye serves as the administrative center of Ramensky District. As an administrative division, it is, together with the village of Dergayevo, incorporated within Ramensky District as the Town of Ramenskoye. As a municipal division, the Town of Ramenskoye is incorporated within Ramensky Municipal District as Ramenskoye Urban Settlement.

Transportation
The Ramenskoye Airport serves the Gromov Flight Research Institute.

Sports
FC Saturn Ramenskoye is the local association football club.

References

Notes

Sources

Cities and towns in Moscow Oblast
Ramensky District
Bronnitsky Uyezd